Uncial 091 in the Gregory-Aland numbering), ε 30 (Soden), is a Greek uncial manuscript of the New Testament, dated paleographically to the 6th-century.

Description 

The codex contains a small parts of the Gospel of John 6:13-14.22-24, on one parchment leaf (32 cm by 28 cm). The leaf survived in 3/4. The text is written in two columns per page, 23 lines per page, in large uncial letters. Letter iota is written with diaeresis. 

The Greek text of this codex is a representative of the Alexandrian text-type with some alien readings. Aland placed it in Category II.

In John 6:23 the reading  (the Lord had given thanks) is omitted, as in codices D, a, d, e, syrc, syrs, arm, geo1.

Currently it is dated by the INTF to the 6th-century.

The codex now is located at the Russian National Library (Gr. 279) in Saint Petersburg.

See also 

 List of New Testament uncials
 Textual criticism

References

Further reading 

 Caspar René Gregory, Textkritik des Neuen Testamentes III (Leipzig, 1909), p. 1063.
 U. B. Schmid, D. C. Parker, W. J. Elliott, The Gospel according to St. John: The majuscules (Brill 2007), pp. 110–114. [text of the codex]

External links 
 Uncial 091 at the Wieland Willker, "Textual Commentary"

Greek New Testament uncials
6th-century biblical manuscripts
National Library of Russia collection